The Parker ministry was the third ministry of the Colony of New South Wales, and was led by Henry Parker. Parker was elected in the first free elections for the New South Wales Legislative Assembly held in March 1856 and, following the failure of the Donaldson and Cowper Governments to maintain the confidence of the Assembly, was asked to form Government.

The title of Premier was widely used to refer to the Leader of Government, but not enshrined in formal use until 1920.

There was no party system in New South Wales politics until 1887. Under the constitution, ministers were required to resign to recontest their seats in a by-election when appointed. Henry Parker narrowly won the by election for Parramatta. John Darvall comfortably won the by-election for Cumberland North Riding, and William Manning comfortably won the by-election for Cumberland South Riding, Stuart Donaldson was defeated at the by election for Sydney Hamlets, however he re-gained a seat in the parliament at the November by-election for Cumberland South Riding, Only John Hay (Murrumbidgee) was re-elected unopposed.

This ministry covers the period from 3 October 1856 until on 7 September 1857, when Parker resigned his commission, having lost an electoral bill. During this period, there was a slight re-arrangement to the ministry, following the resignation of William Manning on account of ill-health, with John Darvall promoted to Attorney-General and Edward Wise being appointed to the junior role of Solicitor-General.

Composition of ministry

 
Ministers are members of the Legislative Assembly unless otherwise noted.

See also

Self-government in New South Wales
Members of the New South Wales Legislative Assembly, 1856–1858

Notes

References

 

New South Wales ministries
1856 establishments in Australia
1857 disestablishments in Australia